Hickman is a city in and the county seat of Fulton County, Kentucky, United States. Located on the Mississippi River, the city had a population of 2,365 at the 2020 U.S. census and is classified as a home rule-class city. Hickman is part of the Union City micropolitan area.

History
This area was long occupied by various cultures of indigenous peoples. European-American settlement of this area did not begin until decades after the American Revolutionary War. James Mills built the first cabin on the site in 1819. The community of Mills Point was large enough to receive a post office in 1830. Around 1834, G. Marr purchased much of the surrounding area and laid out more streets.

The community was renamed Hickman in 1837 after the maiden name of Marr's wife. The city was formally incorporated by the state assembly on February 18, 1841. In 1845, it became the county seat.

David Walker, his wife, and their four children were lynched in Hickman in 1908 after Mr. Walker was accused of using inappropriate language with a white woman. 

Two floods devastated Hickman, the first in 1912 and the second in 1913.  The flood of 1912 began when a levee located near Hickman broke. Within a few hours the water had risen to the roofs of houses. The flood of 1913 began when a levee near West Hickman broke on April 4. Baseball pitcher Rube Waddell was among the many who helped save the city during both floods. Waddell came down with pneumonia after each flood; he died of tuberculosis.

Registered historic sites
Thomas Chapel C.M.E. Church is an historic African-American church on Moscow Avenue in Hickman, part of the Colored Methodist Episcopal Church formed by freedmen after the American Civil War. Freedmen set up their own denomination in order to be independent of white supervision in the Methodist Church, South, which had split away from northern congregations at the outbreak of war. (In 1954 the CME changed its name to Christian Methodist Episcopal Church.) The church in Hickman was built in 1895. It was added to the National Register of Historic Places in 1979.

Geography

Climate
The climate in this area is characterized by hot, humid summers and generally mild to cool winters.  According to the Köppen Climate Classification system, Hickman has a humid subtropical climate, abbreviated "Cfa" on climate maps.

Demographics

2020 census

As of the 2020 United States Census, there were 2,365 people, 752 households, and 385 families residing in the city.

2000 census
As of the census of 2000, there were 2,560 people, 1,015 households, and 665 families residing in the city. The racial makeup of the city was 64.06% White, 34.96% African American, 0.08% Native American, 0.04% from other races, and 0.86% from two or more races. Hispanic or Latino of any race were 0.51% of the population.

There were 1,015 households, out of which 28.2% had children under the age of 18 living with them, 39.8% were married couples living together, 22.4% had a female householder with no husband present, and 34.4% were non-families. 32.1% of all households were made up of individuals, and 14.8% had someone living alone who was 65 years of age or older. The average household size was 2.33 and the average family size was 2.94.

In the city, the population was spread out, with 24.9% under the age of 18, 10.9% from 18 to 24, 26.8% from 25 to 44, 23.0% from 45 to 64, and 14.4% who were 65 years of age or older. The median age was 36 years. For every 100 females, there were 94.2 males. For every 100 females age 18 and over, there were 90.2 males.

The median income for a household in the city was $21,655, and the median income for a family was $27,384. Males had a median income of $25,625 versus $18,264 for females. The per capita income for the city was $11,573. About 24.8% of families and 27.1% of the population were below the poverty line, including 35.0% of those under age 18 and 18.7% of those age 65 or over.

Notable people 

 Amy L. Bondurant, former U.S. Ambassador to the Organization for Economic Cooperation and Development (OECD)
 Robert Glen Coe, convicted murderer
 S.G. Goodman, singer-songwriter
 Elvis Jacob Stahr Jr., President of Indiana University

Education
Hickman has a public library, a branch of the Fulton County Public Library.

References

External links

 City of Hickman - City Hall and Utilities website

Cities in Kentucky
Kentucky populated places on the Mississippi River
Cities in Fulton County, Kentucky
County seats in Kentucky
Union City, Tennessee micropolitan area
Populated places established in 1819
1819 establishments in Kentucky